Michael Anthony Fleet (born 1938), is an athletics coach and former athlete who competed for England.

Athletics career
He represented England in the 880 yards at the 1962 British Empire and Commonwealth Games in Perth, Western Australia.

He was a member of the Croydon Harriers Club and remains there as a coach.

References

1938 births
English male middle-distance runners
Athletes (track and field) at the 1962 British Empire and Commonwealth Games
Living people
Commonwealth Games competitors for England
Universiade medalists in athletics (track and field)
Universiade bronze medalists for Great Britain